Kenyon is a city in southwestern Goodhue County, Minnesota, United States, located along the North Fork of the Zumbro River. It was founded in 1856 and named in honor of Kenyon College. It is known for the Boulevard of roses on main street, which is the namesake of the town festival "Rosefest" held every August. The population was 1,815 at the 2010 census.

Geography

Minnesota State Highways 56 and 60 are two of the main routes in the city.  Minnesota State Highway 246 is immediately north of Kenyon.

Demographics

2010 census
As of the census of 2010, there were 1,815 people, 755 households, and 465 families living in the city. The racial makeup of the city was 94.9% White, 0.2% African American, 0.2% Native American, 0.2% Asian, 3.8% from other races, and 0.8% from two or more races. Hispanic or Latino of any race were 8.7% of the population.

There were 755 households, of which 29.7% had children under the age of 18 living with them, 49.4% were married couples living together, 8.1% had a female householder with no husband present, 4.1% had a male householder with no wife present, and 38.4% were non-families. 31.7% of all households were made up of individuals, and 15.1% had someone living alone who was 65 years of age or older. The average household size was 2.34 and the average family size was 2.92.

The median age in the city was 41.3 years. 23.7% of residents were under the age of 18; 7.6% were between the ages of 18 and 24; 24.4% were from 25 to 44; 23.7% were from 45 to 64; and 20.6% were 65 years of age or older. The gender makeup of the city was 49.4% male and 50.6% female.

2000 census
As of the census of 2000, there were 1,661 people, 677 households, and 440 families living in the city. The racial makeup of the city was 96.21% White, 0.12% African American, 0.18% Native American, 1.02% Asian, 1.93% from other races, and 0.54% from two or more races. Hispanic or Latino of any race were 2.77% of the population.

There were 677 households, out of which 30.6% had children under the age of 18 living with them, 54.4% were married couples living together, 7.4% had a female householder with no husband present, and 34.9% were non-families. 29.8% of all households were made up of individuals, and 15.1% had someone living alone who was 65 years of age or older.  The average household size was 2.37 and the average family size was 2.94.

In the city, the population was spread out, with 23.9% under the age of 18, 7.3% from 18 to 24, 27.5% from 25 to 44, 19.7% from 45 to 64, and 21.6% who were 65 years of age or older.  The median age was 39 years. For every 100 females, there were 93.1 males.  For every 100 females age 18 and over, there were 86.7 males.

The median income for a household in the city was $41,786, and the median income for a family was $50,000. Males had a median income of $34,000 versus $22,255 for females. The per capita income for the city was $19,569.  About 2.3% of families and 5.2% of the population were below the poverty line, including 5.9% of those under age 18 and 7.0% of those age 65 or over.

Notable people
 C. L. Brusletten, legislator and businessman
 Stephanie Edwards
 Mark Rein·Hagen - Game designer and author
 Clifford L. Hilton - Minnesota Supreme Court justice
 Mabel Johnson Leland – lecturer, translator 
 Luke Redfield - Singer/songwriter
 Steve Sviggum - 55th Speaker of the Minnesota House of Representatives
 Andrew Volstead - Politician known for the Volstead Act

See also

 List of cities in Minnesota
 Kenyon Public Library

References

External links

 

Cities in Minnesota
Cities in Goodhue County, Minnesota
Zumbro River